Kings for a Day is a 1997 French comedy film directed by . It was entered into the 20th Moscow International Film Festival.

Cast
 Stéphane Freiss as Edek
  as Roman
 Maruschka Detmers as Elizabeth
 Louis Velle as Kurt
 Thierry Lhermitte as The Producer
 Marie-Christine Adam as The Journalist
 Jacques Sereys as Botteret
 Pauline Macia as Gisèle
 Betty Bomonde as La starlette
  as Tom
 Jesse Joe Walsh as Bob Gore

References

External links
 

1997 films
1997 comedy films
French comedy films
1990s French-language films
1990s French films